İstikbal Furniture S.A. (Turkish: İstikbal Mobilya A.Ş) is a Turkish furniture retailer that was founded in 1989 by Hacı Boydak. 

In 2016, Boydak Holding was found affiliated with FETÖ, and the company was seized by SDIF (TMSF).

References 

Turkish companies established in 1957
1957 establishments in Turkey
Companies formerly affiliated with the Gülen movement